The third season of the television drama series Wentworth premiered on SoHo in Australia on 7 April 2015. It was executively produced by FremantleMedia's Director of Drama, Jo Porter. The season comprises 12 episodes. Season three picks up four months after Bea's return to Wentworth following her escape and revenge murder of Brayden Holt.

Plot 
Four months have passed since Bea Smith's bold escape and ruthless murder of Brayden Holt. Having returned to Wentworth Correctional Centre, Bea has assumed the mantle of Top Dog, hailed by all – including Franky Doyle herself – as a worthy successor. Franky may no longer be Top Dog but she's not about to forget how Liz lagged on her, and Boomer is set to make Liz pay. Doreen's baby bump is growing and Ferguson is watching her closely. While Vera's instincts are more attuned to Ferguson's scheming, Will is none the wiser despite Fletch's apparent hit and run accident.

Cast

Regular 
 Danielle Cormack as Bea Smith
 Nicole da Silva as Franky Doyle
 Celia Ireland as Liz Birdsworth
 Shareena Clanton as Doreen Anderson
 Aaron Jeffery as Matt "Fletch" Fletcher
 Robbie Magasiva as Will Jackson
 Katrina Milosevic as Sue "Boomer" Jenkins
 Kate Atkinson as Deputy Governor Vera Bennett
 Pamela Rabe as Governor Joan Ferguson

Recurring 
 Socratis Otto as Maxine Conway 
 Tammy Macintosh as Kaz Proctor
 Libby Tanner as Bridget Westfall
 Georgia Chara as Jess Warner 
 Pia Miranda as Jodie Spiteri
 Ra Chapman as Kim Chang
 Jacquie Brennan as Linda Miles 
 Martin Sacks as Derek Channing
 Edwina Samuels as Sophie Donaldson
 Maggie Naouri as Rose Atkins
 Damien Richardson as Detective Michael Mears
 Tony Nikolakopoulos as Nils Jasper
 Alex Menglet as Fencing Master
 Sally-Anne Upton as Lucy "Juice" Gambaro
 Charli Tjoe as Tina Mercado
 Miles Paras as Cindy Lou
 Kasia Kaczmarek as Lindsay Coulter
 Bessie Holland as Stella Radic

Episodes

Production 
On 29 January 2014, it was announced that FremantleMedia had renewed Wentworth for a third season, set to air in 2015.

Jo Porter, the Director of Drama at FremantleMedia stated, "Foxtel have been the perfect broadcast partner and have given Wentworth the ideal platform for it to achieve such success both domestically and then internationally. To have this unique Australian program now airing across the globe fills us with great pride. The commissioning of season three is such a compliment to the hard work and talent of the writers, directors, our outstanding cast and of course the crew, most of whom have been with us since season one. We look forward to continuing our success both here and overseas."

Brian Walsh, the Executive Director of Television at Foxtel stated, "Wentworth's first season was a triumph with its remarkable performance and production qualities which enthralled our Australian audience and achieved such great international recognition. Since October, the cast and the production team, led by producer Amanda Crittenden, have been back on-location delivering on the promise of season two's gripping scripts and the story lines for season three are sensational."

A third season was confirmed on 29 January 2014. A five-month production commenced in the purpose-built set in March 2014. The final table read for season three took place on 8 July 2014. Filming for the third season began in March 2014 and concluded in July 2014.

Former All Saints stars Pia Miranda, Libby Tanner and Tammy Macintosh joined the cast as inmate Jodie Spiteri, psychologist Bridget Westfall and vigilante Karen Proctor, respectively.

Reception

Ratings

Accolades 

 AACTA Awards (2015)
 Won: Best Lead Actress in a Television Drama – Pamela Rabe
 Nominated: Best Television Drama Series – Wentworth – Jo Porter & Amanda Crittenden
 Nominated: Subscription Television 20th Anniversary Award for Best Drama – Wentworth
 Australian Writers' Guild Awards (2015 & 2016) 
 Won: Best Script for a Television Series – Stuart Page (Episode 1: "The Governor's Pleasure")
 Nominated: Best Script for a Television Series – Pete McTighe (Episode 12: "Blood and Fire")
 Logie Awards (2016)
 Nominated: Most Outstanding Actress – Pamela Rabe
 Won: Most Outstanding Supporting Actress – Celia Ireland
 Nominated: Most Outstanding Drama Series – Wentworth

Home media

Notes

References

External links 
 

2015 Australian television seasons
Wentworth (TV series)